Guarani de Goiás is a municipality in eastern Goiás state, Brazil.  Guarani is a very poor municipality in the northeast of the state.

Geography
Guarani belongs to the Vão do Paranã statistical microregion.  There are municipal boundaries with  São Domingos, Iaciara, Posse, and the state of Bahia

Guarani is located south of the Terra Ronca state park (Terra Ronca) and 28 kilometers north of Posse.  It is 35 kilometers to the important BR-020 highway, which links Brasília to Salvador.  Guarani is crossed by the Frei River, which has one of the most beautiful waterfalls in the region.  For a map of the waterfall see Terraronca

The distance to Goiânia is 550 km.  Connections are made by taking	BR-153 / Anápolis / GO-060 / Alexânia / Planaltina / Formosa / GO-020 / BR-030 / Vila Boa / Alvorada do Norte / GO-108 / Posse.

Demographics
Population density: 3.34 inhabitants/km2
Population in 1980: 3,978
Population in 2007: 4,105
Urban population: 1,743
Rural population: 2,362
Population growth rate:   -1.28%

Economy
The main economic activities are cattle raising, poultry raising, and agriculture (beans, manioc corn, and bananas).
There were no hospitals in 2007.
Industrial units: 1
Retail commercial units: 30
Motor vehicles (automobiles and pickup trucks): 146
Number of inhabitants per motor vehicle: 28

Agricultural data 2006
Farms:  550
Total area:  165,143 ha.
Area of permanent crops: 149 ha.
Area of perennial crops: 1,713 ha.
Area of pasture:  106,927 ha. 
Area of woodland and forests:  53,907 ha. 
Persons dependent on farming:  1,750
Cattle herd:  55,200  
Corn: 450 ha.    
Sugarcane:  80 ha. 
Rice:  450 ha.
Beans: 60 ha.
Manioc:  60 ha.

Health and education
Ranking on the Municipal Human Development Index: 0.632
State ranking:  238 (out of 242 in 2000)
National ranking:  4,091 (out of 5,507 in 2000)  
Literacy rate: 72.2% (2000)
Infant mortality rate: 37.81 in 1,000 live births (2000)
Schools:  12 with 1,429 students
Hospitals: none in 2007

History
The town was first created as a district of the municipality of  São Domingos with the name of Guarani in 1919.  In 1943 the name was changed to Coatiçaba.  In 1963 it was dismembered from São Domingos and formed a new municipality with the name Guarani de Goiás.

See also
List of municipalities in Goiás
Microregions in Goiás
Vão do Paranã Microregion

References

Frigoletto
Transporte

Municipalities in Goiás